Mac OS X Server 1.0 is an operating system developed by Apple Computer, Inc. Released on March 16, 1999, it was the first version of Mac OS X Server.

It was Apple's first commercial product to be derived from "Rhapsody"—an eventual replacement for the classic Mac OS derived from NeXTSTEP's architecture (acquired in 1997 as part of Apple's purchase of NeXT) and BSD-like Mach kernel. It could run applications written using the "Yellow Box" API, and featured components such as NetBoot, the QuickTime Streaming Server, components carried over from NeXTSTEP, and the "Blue Box" environment (which allows a Mac OS 8.5 session to be launched as a separate process to run legacy Mac OS software).

Mac OS X Server 1.0 was a prelude to the first consumer-oriented version of the OS—Mac OS X 10.0—which was released in 2001. It did not include the eventual Aqua user interface (instead using NeXTSTEP's Workspace Manager shell mixed with aspects of Mac OS 8's "Platinum" user interface) or Carbon API.

Features
Server 1.0 contains a mix of features from the classic Mac OS, NeXTSTEP and Mac OS X. Like the classic Mac OS, it has a single menu bar across the top of the screen, but file management is performed in Workspace Manager from NeXTSTEP instead of the classic Mac OS Finder. The user interface still uses the Display PostScript-based window server from NeXTSTEP, instead of the Quartz-based WindowServer, which would appear a year later in Mac OS X Public Beta. Unlike any version of Classic Mac OS, windows with unsaved content display a black dot in the window close button like NeXTSTEP did. The Dock and the Aqua appearance were not included; these were added later in Mac OS X.

"Carbon", essentially a subset of "classic" Mac OS API calls, was also absent. This meant that the only native applications for OS X Server 1.0 were written for the "Yellow Box" API, which went on to become known as "Cocoa". Furthermore, Apple's own FireWire was not supported.

Server 1.0 also includes the first version of a NetBoot server, which allows computers to boot from a disk image over a local network. This was particularly useful in a school or other public-machine setting, as it allowed the machines to be booted from a single OS copy stored on Server 1.0. This made it difficult for users to damage the OS by installing software – as soon as they signed out, the machine would re-boot with a fresh OS from the NetBoot server.

To run classic Mac OS applications, Mac OS X Server 1.0 includes the "Blue Box", which essentially ran a copy of Mac OS 8.5.1 (this could be updated to Mac OS 8.6 in version 1.2 and later) in a separate process as an emulation layer. Blue Box would eventually be renamed as the "Classic Environment" in Mac OS X, featuring the latest version of Mac OS 9.

Reception

Although marketed as a large advancement over AppleShare IP, it cost $499 and did not support Apple's own FireWire, making it incompatible with products like MicroNet's SANcube, a line of external high-speed high-capacity storage systems (debuting in the year 2000 for $4599 to $6999). Buyers of OS X Server 1.0 (who often purchased new Macs to run it) and the SANcube were forced to downgrade to AppleShare IP in order to use it. OS X Server 1.0 was quickly orphaned, in favor of Mac OS X 10.0, with no discount for those who purchased it and wished to purchase OS X Server 10.0. The result is that some considered the release premature and even a bait and switch.

Release history

Timeline

See also
Rhapsody (operating system)
Mac OS X Server

References

External links
Mac OS X Server 1.0 to 1.2: System Requirements
Mac OS X Server 1.2 - What's new? By: Scott Anguish

MacOS
1999 software
MacOS Server